The 1983 Denver Broncos season was its 24th in professional football and 14th in the National Football League (NFL). Led by third-year head coach Dan Reeves, the Broncos were 9–7, third in the AFC West, and made their first playoff appearance in four seasons.

Before the season, the Broncos traded with the Baltimore Colts for the rights to first overall pick in the 1983 draft, quarterback John Elway. He started ten games for the Broncos as a rookie, and the team won four of them.
In his first two starts, both road wins, Elway left the game trailing, relieved by veteran Steve DeBerg.

After three straight losses, Elway was benched by Reeves in early October; and DeBerg led the team to four consecutive victories and a 6–3 record. A shoulder injury in a loss in Seattle sidelined him and Elway again became the starter. In the rematch with Seattle two weeks later in Denver, Elway was out with the flu and third-string rookie Gary Kubiak led the Broncos to a win.

Elway's finest game as a rookie came in Week 15, the Broncos' second game against Baltimore, the team that drafted him. Denver trailed 19–0 at the start of the fourth quarter, until Elway threw for three touchdowns in the final period to win 21–19 and kept their playoff hopes alive. The following week was a lopsided road loss at Kansas City in  wind chill, but the Broncos made the playoffs, gaining the final AFC berth over Cleveland, also at 9–7, whom they defeated in Week 14.

DeBerg started the wild card playoff loss in Seattle,  and was relieved by Elway in the fourth quarter.

The Broncos' wild-card playoff loss to the Seahawks marked their only playoff appearance during the three-year ownership of Edgar Kaiser Jr.; Pat Bowlen bought the team the following spring.

NFL Draft

Personnel

Staff

Source:

Roster

Regular season

Schedule

Game summaries

Week 1

    
    
    
    

Source:

Week 2

Source: Pro-Football-Reference.com
    
    
    
    
    

Source:

Week 15 vs Colts

Standings

Playoffs

References

External links
Denver Broncos – 1983 media guide
1983 Denver Broncos at Pro-Football-Reference.com

Denver Broncos
Denver Broncos seasons
Denver Bronco